Shawnee Township is one of ten townships in Gallatin County, Illinois, USA.  As of the 2010 census, its population was 230 and it contained 137 housing units.

Geography

Cities, towns, villages
 Old Shawneetown

Cemeteries
The township contains Immaculate Conception Cemetery.

Major highways
  Illinois Route 13

Rivers
 Ohio River

Lakes
 Big Lake
 Black Lake
 Fehrer Lake
 Fish Lake

Landmarks

Demographics

School districts
 Gallatin Community Unit School District 7

Political districts
 Illinois's 19th congressional district
 State House District 118
 State Senate District 59

References
 
 United States Census Bureau 2007 TIGER/Line Shapefiles
 United States National Atlas

External links
 City-Data.com
 Illinois State Archives

Townships in Gallatin County, Illinois
Townships in Illinois